Doris Gontersweiler-Vetterli (born 21 August 1933) is a Swiss former backstroke swimmer. She competed at the 1948, 1952 and the 1960 Summer Olympics.

References

External links
 

1933 births
Living people
Swiss female backstroke swimmers
Olympic swimmers of Switzerland
Swimmers at the 1948 Summer Olympics
Swimmers at the 1952 Summer Olympics
Swimmers at the 1960 Summer Olympics
Sportspeople from Zürich
20th-century Swiss women